Federico Elguera (1860–1928) was a Peruvian politician in the early 20th century. He was the mayor of Lima from 1901 to 1908 and Ambassador to Bolivia from 1911 to 1912.

Mayors of Lima
1860 births
1928 deaths